A rogue trader is person who makes financial trades in an unauthorised manner.

Rogue trader may also refer to:
Rogue Trader (book), the autobiography of (and later a movie about) Nick Leeson, the man who caused the collapse of Barings Bank
Rogue Trader (film), the 1999 film about Nick Leeson directed by James Dearden
Warhammer 40,000: Rogue Trader, the first edition of the Warhammer 40,000 franchise
Rogue Trader (role-playing game), the second role-playing game in the Warhammer 40,000 roleplay sub-franchise

See also
 Rogue Traders, an Australian electronic rock group
 Rogue Traders (TV programme), a BBC consumer affairs television programme